Rahel Szalit-Marcus (2 July 1888 – August 1942) was a Jewish artist and illustrator. Born Rahel Markus in Telz [Telsiai] in the Kovno region of Lithuania, then part of the Russian Empire, she was active in Berlin during the Weimar Republic and in Paris in the 1930s. She was best known for her illustrations of East European Jewish subjects. Szalit-Marcus was murdered at Auschwitz in August 1942.

Life 
Rahel Markus spent her later childhood years in Lodz and eventually acquired Polish citizenship. A native Yiddish speaker, she also learned Polish, German, and French. In 1910 she moved from Lodz to Munich to study art. There she befriended the artists Henri Epstein and Marcel Słodski. She also studied in Paris and London. Rahel was married to actor Julius Szalit (born Julius Schalit in 1892) from 1915 until his death by suicide in 1919.

Rahel Szalit-Marcus lived in Berlin from 1916 to 1933, and from 1921 onwards she resided at Stübbenstrasse 3 in the Bavarian Quarter of Schöneberg. She went by the name Rahel Szalit beginning in the mid-1920s. Her work appeared in several exhibitions of the Berliner Secession, a German art movement that was established at the turn of the century. Szalit was acquainted with Jewish Expressionist artists Ludwig Meidner and Jakob Steinhardt, and she had the support of art historians Karl Schwarz and Rachel Wischnitzer, among others. Szalit spent time at well-known cafés frequented by artists and émigrés. She built connections to such intellectuals as Polish-German writer Eleonore Kalkowska. Szalit’s lithographic images were at times compared to the work of Käthe Kollwitz.

Active in the Association of Women Artists in Berlin beginning in 1927, Szalit was able to exhibit her paintings and other work alongside such renowned artists as Käthe Kollwitz, Lotte Laserstein, Julie Wolfthorn, Käthe Münzer-Neumann, Grete Csaki-Copony, and Else Haensgen-Dingkuhn. She became better known internationally with a prizewinning painting in the 1929 exhibition Die Frau von heute. 

Szalit fled to France after the Nazis came to power in Germany in 1933. She lived in Montparnasse, where she was affiliated with the School of Paris.In June 1935, she gave a solo exhibition at the Galerie Zborowski (founded by Léopold Zborowski), and remained active in Paris through 1939.

In July 1942, Szalit-Marcus was arrested in the Vel d’Hiv Roundup, and she was deported to Auschwitz in August 1942. Her Paris studio was plundered, and many of her original works were destroyed or lost.

Work 
Rahel Szalit-Marcus was a painter and graphic artist known for her lithographic illustrations. She created oil paintings, watercolors, and drawings (in ink, pastel, and chalk), and she began to exhibit her paintings around 1920. In the early 1920s, she illustrated books and print portfolios, most of which have survived. In the late 1920s and early 1930s, she continued to paint, and her illustrations appeared in numerous periodicals.

Surviving Works: Illustrated Books and Print Portfolios 
 Fyodor Dostoyevsky, Das Krokodil, 1921 
 Leo Tolstoy, Die Kreutzersonate, 1922
 Sholem Aleichem, Menshelakh un stsenes (Motl, the Cantor’s Son), 1922 – portfolio
 Mendele Moykher Sforim, Fischke der Krumme, 1922 – portfolio
 Hayim Nachman Bialik, Ketina Kol-bo, 1923
 Charles Dickens, Londoner Bilder (stories from Sketches by Boz), 1923
 Heinrich Heine, Hebräische Melodien, 1923 – portfolio
 Claude Tillier, Mein Onkel Benjamin, 1927

Gallery

References

Literature 
 "Szalit, Rahel." The Universal Jewish Encyclopedia, volume 10, (1943).
 "Rachel Szalit-Marcus." Jewish Virtual Library
 Hedwig Brenner, Jüdische Frauen in der bildenden Kunst. Ein biographisches Verzeichnis, Vol. 2, ed. Erhard Roy Wiehn (Konstanz: Hartung-Gorre Verlag, 2004), 331–32.
 Anna Dzabagina, “Berlin’s Left Bank? Eleonore Kalkowska in Women’s Artistic Networks of Weimar Berlin” in Polish Avant-Garde in Berlin, ed. Malgorzata Stolarksa-Fronia      (Berlin: Peter Lang, 2019), 151–69.
 Hersh Fenster, Undzere farpaynikte kinstler (Paris: H. Fenster, 1951), foreword by Marc Chagall, 231-35.
 Hersh Fenster, Nos artistes martyrs (Paris: Hazan, 2021).
 Gerd Gruber, “Szalit, Rahel.” Allgemeines Künstlerlexikon. Die Bildenden Künstler aller Zeiten und Völker. Vol. 107 (Berlin: De Gruyter, 2020), 329.
 Sabine Koller, “Mentshelekh un stsenes. Rahel Szalit-Marcus illustriert Sholem Aleichem, in Leket: Yiddish Studies Today, ed. Marion Aptroot, Efrat Gal-Ed, Roland Gruschka, and Simon Neuberg (Düsselfdorf: Düsseldorf University Press, 2012), 207–31.
 Kerry Wallach, Passing Illusions: Jewish Visibility in Weimar Germany (Ann Arbor: University of Michigan Press, 2017), 48–50.

External Links 
 
 Works by Rahel Szalit at Jewish Museum Berlin
 Works by Rahel Szalit at Jewish Historical Institute Warsaw
 Polona Site with digitized images of Szalit’s Motl illustrations
 Musée d’art et d’histoire du Judaïsme
 Center for Jewish History
 “Rahel Szalit-Marcus and Solomon Gershov Illustrate Sholem Aleichem,” virtual exhibition of the Derfner Judaica Museum
 Verein der Berliner Künstlerinnen
  Rahel Szalit-Marcus, Artistes juifs de l’École de Paris

Jewish illustrators
Jewish women painters
Jewish painters
Expressionist painters
Modern painters
Jewish emigrants from Nazi Germany to France
Polish people who died in Auschwitz concentration camp
1888 births
1942 deaths
German Jews who died in the Holocaust
Polish Jews who died in the Holocaust
German people who died in Auschwitz concentration camp
20th-century German women artists
20th-century Polish women artists
German women illustrators
Polish women illustrators
German women painters
Polish women painters
Naturalized citizens of Poland
Polish portrait painters
German portrait painters